Christian H. Fischbacher (February 13, 1913 – January 2, 2006) was a Swiss skeleton racer who competed in the late 1940s. He competed in the skeleton event at the 1948 Winter Olympics in St. Moritz, but did not finish.

References
Skeletonsport.com results
Brief Biography

1913 births
2006 deaths
Swiss male skeleton racers
Olympic skeleton racers of Switzerland
Skeleton racers at the 1948 Winter Olympics